Edward Herrick Allen (April 24, 1830 – December 1, 1895) was a Republican Kansas City Mayor in 1867.

Biography
Allen was born in Danbury, Connecticut and claimed a Mayflower ancestry. He graduated from Marietta College and later Lane Seminary in Cincinnati. In 1859 he married Agnes Beecher, niece of Henry Ward Beecher.

He was a member of the Grand Army of the Republic during the American Civil War. He came to Kansas City after the War and was one of the founders of the Kansas City Board of Trade and was president of First National Bank. He promoted the use of coal gas to light the city. In 1882, he was one of the original incorporators of the Kansas City Club.

He died in 1895 and is interred in Elmwood Cemetery.

References

1830 births
1895 deaths
Burials at Elmwood Cemetery (Kansas City, Missouri)
Politicians from Danbury, Connecticut
American bankers
Mayors of Kansas City, Missouri
Marietta College alumni
Missouri Republicans
19th-century American politicians
19th-century American businesspeople